Sebastopol is a southern suburb on the rural-urban fringe of Ballarat, Victoria, Australia.

It is named after Sevastopol in Crimea, the site of an important battle during the Crimean War.

Formerly a separate town, Sebastopol had municipal status between 1864 and 1994 after which the Borough of Sebastopol was merged into the City of Ballarat.

Today it is the site of numerous light-industrial businesses and primarily low cost single-family detached homes and is a fringe suburb in Ballarat and also one of the most car dependent areas in the city.

History
The first inhabitants of the area were the Wathaurong Indigenous Australian tribe.

The first settler was Henry Anderson who had a property at Winters Creek.  In 1838, Jock Winter named the area "Bonshaw". In 1855, it was renamed after Sevastopol in Crimea.

Sebastopol's origin was a separate working class town servicing the rich gold mining fields south of Ballarat.

The Post Office opened on 5 October 1857.

Sebastopol Town Hall was opened on 19 March 1869.

On August 14, 1913 the tramway to Ballarat opened which led to it becoming by the mid 20th century part of the Ballarat urban area.

Education
Sebastopol is served by a joint primary and secondary school, Phoenix College, several kindergartens, a post office and library, and several small shopping precincts including three supermarkets.

Transport
Buses have operated in Sebastopol since 21 September 1971 after they replaced the tram service.  Ballarat Transit now provides regular bus services between Ballarat CBD and Sebastopol.

Community
Sebastopol is home to The Complex Recreation Centre, most commonly known as "The Complex". The building was built in 1961 and is rich in history, but has only recently transformed into a second home for Ballarat's troubled youths.

Sport
Sebastopol has an Australian rules football team competing in the Ballarat Football League.
The Sebastopol Vikings play association football/soccer in the Ballarat & District Soccer Association.

References

Mining towns in Victoria (Australia)
Suburbs of Ballarat